Zach Cook (born 15 July 1999) is a speedway rider from Australia.

Speedway career 
Cook signed for Plymouth Gladiators for the SGB Championship 2021 season. The following season in 2022, he rode for the Poole Pirates in the SGB Championship 2022, and was instrumental in helping Poole retain their tier 2 League and Knockout Cup double crown.

In 2023, he signed for Wolverhampton Wolves, where he would make his Premiership debut in the SGB Premiership 2023. He also re-signed for Poole for the SGB Championship 2023.

Personal life
His brother is fellow professional rider Ben Cook.

References 

Living people
1999 births
Australian speedway riders
Plymouth Gladiators speedway riders
Poole Pirates riders
Wolverhampton Wolves riders
Sportsmen from New South Wales